"Can You Forgive Her?" is a song by English synth-pop duo Pet Shop Boys, released as the first single from their fifth studio album, Very (1993). The lyrics describe in the second person a young man's humiliation when his girlfriend accuses him of still being in love with a childhood friend; the woman is "not prepared to share you with a memory", and is "going to go and get herself a real man instead". The title of the song derives from the Anthony Trollope novel of the same name.

"Can You Forgive Her?" was released on 1 June 1993 as the lead single from Very, and became the duo's 13th top-10 single on the UK Singles Chart, debuting and peaking at number seven. Despite failing to enter the US Billboard Hot 100, it became a number-one single on the Billboard Dance Club Songs chart. The song reached the top 10 in Denmark, Finland, Italy and Sweden.

The second B-side, "What Keeps Mankind Alive?", appears on the 2001 re-release of Introspective, having originally been recorded for a BBC Radio programme in 1988 narrated by Sting celebrating the 60th anniversary of Bertolt Brecht and Kurt Weill's musical The Threepenny Opera.

Marketing and music video
In marketing for the single, the Pet Shop Boys adopted a costume involving orange overalls and extremely tall pointy hats ("dunce caps"). The accompanying music video was directed by Howard Greenhalgh and depicted the duo wearing the costumes while wandering in a surreal (partly) computer-generated environment. Live action shots were filmed in a number of either well known or futuristic locations around London. They cross London Bridge in the rush hour crowd and also walk over the footbridge at Poplar station on the Docklands Light Railway. They are shown at the top of The Monument in the City of London. The park scenes were filmed in Battersea Park and one shot shows them standing in one of the remaining sculptures from the 1951 Festival of Britain fun fair. The music video received heavy rotation on MTV Europe.

The single cover and two inserts with small models depicted Pet Shop Boys costumes, and were both photographed by Marcus Leith.

Critical reception
Stephen Thomas Erlewine from AllMusic described the song as "quietly shocking". Larry Flick from Billboard wrote that the first peek into PSB's new set, Very, "shows 'em hanging on the cutting edge of the trance/rave movement—a logical progression from their synth/pop salad days. Neil Tennant's distinctive "chat" singing is still oozing with deadpan charm, and partner Chris Lowe's penchant for quirky keyboard effects also remains intact." James Muretich from Calgary Herald said they "still sound like disco aristocrats" on songs like "Can You Forgive Her?". The Daily Vault's Michael R. Smith felt it "make a strong impression right from the start". Caroline Sullivan from The Guardian commented, "As ever, it takes several listens for it to resolve itself into a distinctive tune; when it finally does, it's pretty wonderful. Juicy lyric too, something about being rejected by a girl who preferred 'a real man'." Alan Jones from Music Week named it Single of the Week, writing, "Typical sweeping orchestral stabs usher in the first Pet Shop Boys single in 18 months. "Can You Forgive Her?" is, equally typically, a highly mainstream and instant song, with oft-repeated and cheery chorus offsetting the usual mournful vocal from Neil Tennant." He added, "An obvious biggie." 

A reviewer from People Magazine stated, "With his clipped "pass the Grey Poupon" elocution, Tennant talks/sings his way through a mid-tempo dance track about a man torn between his female lover and his closeted desire for a man." James Hamilton from the RM Dance Update described it as a "bouncy thumping strong "disco" anthem". Sian Pattenden from Smash Hits gave "Can You Forgive Her?" three out of five, saying, "Very apt. It seemed they might be relegated to documentaries about pop music but nay - it is a majestic carnival of a return to Popsville, where Neil actually sings." Charles Aaron from Spin wrote, "Spine-tingling, techno-squishy pop-opera, with the year's most appropriate libretto: "She's made you some kind of laughing stock / Because you dance to disco and don't like rock"." Another editor, Jonathan Bernstein declared it as "spiteful" and "a thunderous stomp charting the decline of a relationship with an equal balance of power ("She made fun of you and even in bed / Said she was gonna go and get herself a real man instead")."

Track listings

 UK 7-inch and cassette single
 Australian and Canadian cassette single
 "Can You Forgive Her?" – 3:54
 "Hey, Headmaster" – 3:06

 UK 12-inch single
A1. "Can You Forgive Her?" (Rollo remix) – 6:00
A2. "Can You Forgive Her?" (Rollo dub) – 4:51
B1. "Can You Forgive Her?" (MK remix) – 7:26
B2. "Can You Forgive Her?" (MK dub) – 5:53

 UK and Australian CD1
 "Can You Forgive Her?" – 3:54
 "Hey, Headmaster" – 3:06
 "Can You Forgive Her?" (Rollo remix)
 "Can You Forgive Her?" (Rollo dub)

 UK and Australian CD2; Canadian CD single
 "Can You Forgive Her?" (MK remix) – 7:26
 "I Want to Wake Up" (1993 remix) – 5:25
 "What Keeps Mankind Alive?" – 3:25
 "Can You Forgive Her?" (MK dub) – 5:53

 US maxi-CD single
 "Can You Forgive Her?" – 3:54
 "Can You Forgive Her?" (Rollo remix) – 6:00
 "Can You Forgive Her?" (Rollo dub) – 4:51
 "Can You Forgive Her?" (MK remix) – 7:28
 "Can You Forgive Her?" (MK dub) – 5:53
 "I Want to Wake Up" (1993 remix) – 5:25

 US 12-inch and maxi-cassette single
A1. "Can You Forgive Her?" (Rollo remix) – 6:00
A2. "Can You Forgive Her?" (Rollo dub) – 4:51
A3. "Can You Forgive Her?" – 3:54
B1. "Can You Forgive Her?" (MK remix) – 7:28
B2. "Can You Forgive Her?" (MK dub) – 5:53

 UK cassette single
A. "Can You Forgive Her?" (album version) – 3:54
B. "Can You Forgive Her?" (MK remix edit) – 4:00

Charts

Weekly charts

Year-end charts

References

1993 singles
1993 songs
Finntroll songs
LGBT-related songs
Music videos directed by Howard Greenhalgh
Parlophone singles
Pet Shop Boys songs
Songs written by Chris Lowe
Songs written by Neil Tennant